Khan Yunis Camp, also spelled Khan Younis Camp, is a Palestinian refugee camp in the Khan Yunis Governorate just west of the city of Khan Yunis and two kilometers east of the Mediterranean coast in the southern Gaza Strip. While UNRWA states that there were approximately 72,000 Palestinian refugees living in the camp in 2010, the Palestinian Central Bureau of Statistics recorded a population of 37,705 in the 2007 census. 

Khan Yunis Camp was established after the 1948 Arab–Israeli War, accommodating roughly 35,000 Palestinian refugees. On 3 November 1956, the camp and city of Khan Yunis were occupied by the Israel Defense Forces. In the ensuing operation, about 275 people were killed, including 140 refugees from the camp. Residents state that most of the casualties occurred after hostilities had ended, with the army searching houses for suspected armed men. However, Israeli authorities stated the casualties were a result of resistance by the camp's residents.

According to UNRWA, many of the camp's residents have lost their homes as a result of operations by the Israeli military. UNRWA began reconstruction efforts in the early 2000s, but work has largely been halted due to the blockade imposed by Israel on the Gaza Strip following the Hamas takeover of the territory. UNRWA say that at least 10,000 homes need to be constructed.

Notable residents
 Mohammed Assaf

References

External links
Welcome To Khan Yunis R.C. 

Palestinian refugee camps in the Gaza Strip
Khan Yunis Governorate
Buildings and structures completed in 1948
1948 in Israel